NOVA Parks (formerly named Northern Virginia Regional Park Authority)  is an inter-jurisdictional organization that owns and operates more than 10,000 acres of woodlands, streams, parks, trails, nature reserves, countryside and historic sites in Northern Virginia in the United States. The Authority was organized in 1959. NOVA Parks presently operates 34 regional parks.

A 12-member policy-making Board governs NOVA Parks.  The city council or county board of each member jurisdiction appoints two representatives to the Board. Three counties (Arlington, Fairfax, and Loudoun) and three cities (Alexandria, Falls Church and Fairfax) currently have representation on the Board.

History

NOVA Parks was founded in 1959, when Arlington and Fairfax Counties and the City of Falls Church decided to create an agency to protect the drinking water sources of the area, as well to provide passive recreation.

NOVA Parks purchased its first parkland shortly thereafter in Centreville, VA from Gardiner Means and his wife Caroline F. Ware, in what would become Bull Run Regional Park. The park is well-known for the Virginia bluebells that grow along Bull Run and is a destination in the early spring for visitors to view their blooming. The pair later donated their farm home in Vienna, VA, which would eventually become Meadowlark Botanical Gardens.

NOVA Parks then added sites in Clifton, VA, the City of Fairfax, VA, Fairfax County, Arlington and Alexandria, VA in the 1960s. The agency welcomed Loudoun County, VA in the 1970s. The latter arrangement would lead to the addition of several key sites, including what would become Algonkian Regional Park on the Potomac River, as well as Red Rock Overlook, Temple Hall Farm and Ball's Bluff Battlefield and National Cemetery.

NOVA Parks continued their growth through the 1990s, adding Brambleton Golf Course in Ashburn, VA, and then later, in 2006, adding Aldie Mill Historic Park.  The agency recently added a new facility at Occoquan Regional Park, named after former board member and Fairfax County leader Jean Packard.

In 2022, NOVA Parks acquired Winkler Botanical Preserve as part of an arrangement between NOVA Parks, the city of Alexandria, and then Winkler Organization, which had been the owner.

Historic sites
NOVA Parks manages a number of parks that have historical significance, including an 18th-century mansion, a Civil War battlefield, a 19th-century grist mill, a 200-year-old working farm, a Civil War era church, and many more. Major venues include Carlyle House, the former Alexandria, Virginia home of British merchant John Carlyle; Ball's Bluff Battlefield and National Cemetery, a park in Leesburg, VA that was the site of a Civil War conflict in 1861; Mt. Zion Church and the adjacent Gilbert's Corner Regional Park, in Aldie, VA which were used as a Civil War military rendezvous site, prison, barracks, battleground and hospital; and Aldie Mill Historic Park, a restored mill, with a four-story brick structure with tandem metal Water wheels. Other venues include a kiln used by female prisoners from the Lorton Reformatory during the Women's suffrage Movement, as well Temple Hall Farm and White’s Ford Regional Park, located on the farm formerly owned by Elijah V. White.

During 2018, NOVA Parks also added property near Middleburg, VA, henceforth known as the Battle of Upperville | Goose Creek Regional Park. The roughly 20-acre space features hiking trails and interpretive information, as well as Goose Creek Stone Bridge that was constructed prior to the Civil War.

Waterparks
NOVA Parks operates a total of five waterparks with differing sizes and features.  These include Atlantis Waterpark at Bull Run Regional Park (Centreville), Great Waves Waterpark at Cameron Run Regional Park (Alexandria), Pirate’s Cove Waterpark at Pohick Bay Regional Park (Lorton, VA), Ocean Dunes Waterpark at Upton Hill Regional Park (Arlington) and Volcano Island Waterpark at Algonkian Regional Park (Sterling, VA).

Golf courses
NOVA Parks owns three 18-hole golf courses, including Algonkian, Brambleton and Pohick Bay. Each has a different layout and is Audubon International certified.

Constituent parks

The regional parks and other features administered by NOVA Parks include:

Aldie Mill Historic Park
Algonkian Regional Park
Ball's Bluff Battlefield and National Cemetery
Beaverdam Reservoir
Blue Ridge Regional Park
Brambleton Regional Park
Bull Run Marina
Cameron Run Regional Park
Carlyle House Historic Park
Fountainhead Regional Park
Gateway Regional Park
Goose Creek Historic Park
Gilbert's Corner Regional Park
Hemlock Overlook Regional Park
Meadowlark Botanical Gardens
Mt. Defiance Historic Park
Mt. Zion Historic Park
Occoquan Regional Park
Piscataway Crossing Regional Park
Pohick Bay Regional Park
Potomac Overlook Regional Park
Red Rock Wilderness Overlook Regional Park
Rust Sanctuary
Sandy Run Regional Park
Seneca Regional Park
Temple Hall Farm Regional Park
Tinner Hill Historic Park
Turning Point Suffragist Memorial
Upton Hill Regional Park
Washington and Old Dominion Railroad Regional Park
Webb Nature Sanctuary
Winkler Botanical Preserve

See also
List of parks in the Baltimore–Washington metropolitan area

References

External links
NOVA Parks website

 
Northern Virginia
Virginia municipal and county parks
Parks in Arlington County, Virginia
Parks in Fairfax County, Virginia
Parks in Loudoun County, Virginia
Parks in Alexandria, Virginia
Parks in Falls Church, Virginia
Fairfax, Virginia
Government agencies established in 1959
1959 establishments in Virginia